Rud Sarab (also Romanized as Rūd Sarāb) is a village in Tabas Rural District, in the Central District of Khoshab County, Razavi Khorasan Province, Iran. At the 2006 census, its population was 244, in 74 families.

References 

Populated places in Khoshab County